The Cal State East Bay Pioneers (also CSU East Bay Pioneers, East Bay Pioneers, and CSUEB Pioneers; formerly Cal State Hayward) are the athletic teams that represent California State University, East Bay, located in Hayward, California, in intercollegiate sports as a member of the Division II level of the National Collegiate Athletic Association (NCAA), primarily competing in the California Collegiate Athletic Association (CCAA) for most of their sports since the 2009–10 academic year; while its women's water polo teams compete in the Western Water Polo Association (WWPA). The Pioneers previously competed in the California Pacific Conference (Cal Pac) of the National Association of Intercollegiate Athletics (NAIA) from 1998–99 to 2008–09.

History

Cal State East Bay began Division II competition in 2008 as part of a transition to the NCAA and had previously been a dual member of NCAA Division III and the National Association of Intercollegiate Athletics (NAIA) with ten sports competing as NCAA D-III Independents and five sports in the NAIA's California Pacific Conference. Historically, Cal State East Bay was a member of Division II from 1961–62 to 1997–98.

From 1961 until their closing in 1993, the Pioneers football team won a total of six conference collegiate championships. Cal State East Bay has produced over 160 All-Americans and has won 77 conference championships in NCAA Divisions II and III, as well as in the National Association of Intercollegiate Athletics. In 1972 and 1981, the women's outdoor track and field team won national championships.  The first was an outright championship, and the second was as a member of the AIAW Division III.  In 1979 and 1980 the women's cross country team won AIAW Division III national championships. In 1988 the women's soccer team won the NCAA Division II National Championship. In 2008, the women's water polo team won the Division III National Championship.

Varsity teams
CSUEB competes in 15 intercollegiate varsity sports: Men's sports include baseball, basketball, cross country, golf, soccer and track & field (indoor and outdoor); while women's sports include basketball, cross country, golf, soccer, softball, swimming, track & field (indoor and outdoor), volleyball and water polo.

Championships

Appearances
The CSU East Bay Pioneers competed in the NCAA Tournament across 12 active sports (6 men's and 7 women's) 70 times at the Division II level.

 Baseball (3): 1972,  1977,  2016
 Men's basketball (5): 1977,  1985,  1986,  1987,  1988
 Women's basketball (2): 1989,  2017
 Men's cross country (1): 1986
 Women's cross country (1): 1983
 Men's golf (1): 2017
 Men's soccer (8): 1974,  1975,  1976,  1982,  1983,  1984,  1988,  1989
 Women's soccer (1): 1988,  2021
 Softball (1): 1992
 Women's swimming and diving (11): 1982,  1983,  1985,  1988,  1990,  1991,  1992,  2013,  2014,  2017,  2018
 Men's outdoor track and field (23): 1965,  1968,  1969,  1970,  1971,  1972,  1973,  1974,  1975,  1976,  1977,  1978,  1979,  1980,  1981,  1982,  1983,  1984,  1985,  1989,  1991,  1992,  2016
 Women's outdoor track and field (12): 1982,  1983,  1984,  1985,  1986,  1987,  1988,  1989,  1990,  1991,  1992,  2014
 Women's volleyball (1): 2018

Team
The Pioneers of CSU East Bay earned 2 NCAA team championships at the Division II level.

 Men's (1)
 Outdoor track and field (1): 1977

 Women's (1)
 Soccer (1): 1988

Results

Below are four national championships that were not bestowed by the NCAA:

 Women's cross country – Division III (2): 1979, 1980 (AIAW)
 Women's outdoor track and field – Division I (1): 1972 (AIAW)
 Women's outdoor track and field – Division III (1): 1981 (AIAW)

Individual
CSU East Bay had 22 Pioneers win NCAA individual championships at the Division II level.

References

External links